Tracey Miller (July 21, 1954 – October 7, 2005) was a radio personality, editorial writer, and newspaper editor, who worked for much of her radio career on stations in the Los Angeles area.  From 1990 to 1993 Miller and Terri-Rae Elmer co-hosted KFI's TNT in the Morning, the first morning-drive show in a major market to feature two women in the lead roles.

Miller was born in Santa Maria, California. A four-time winner of the Los Angeles Press Club Golden Mike Award, she became founding editor of the La Crescenta Valley Sun in April, 2002, and wrote a weekly column for the Glendale News-Press in 2005.  In July 2005, the American Women in Radio and Television established a merit award in her honor, to recognize chapter members who have shown commitments to the organization and chapter, and made positive contributions to the broadcasting profession.

Miller, 51, died on October 7, 2005, from complications due to brain cancer. She is survived by her two children, Kelsey Leanne Showalter and Taylor Lee Brittenham.

Station affiliations

References

1954 births
2005 deaths
Deaths from brain tumor
American radio personalities
People from Santa Maria, California
People from La Crescenta-Montrose, California